Stanislas François Jean Lefebvre de Laboulaye (born 12 December 1946 in Beirut) is a French diplomat.

Career
Over the course of his career, Laboulaye has served as the Ambassador Extraordinary and Plenipotentiary of the Republic of France to the Holy See, as Ambassador of France to Russia, and as French ambassador to the United States.

Other activities
 French Institute of International Relations (IFRI), Member of the Strategic Advisory Board

References 

1946 births
Living people
Lycée Henri-IV alumni
University of Paris alumni
École nationale d'administration alumni
Ambassadors of France to Russia
People from Beirut
Officiers of the Légion d'honneur
Officers of the Ordre national du Mérite